Just a Question of Love is a 2000 French-Belgian drama television film directed by Christian Faure that premiered on France 2.

Plot
It follows the romance of two young gay men, Laurent (Cyrille Thouvenin) and Cédric (Stéphan Guérin-Tillié), who are having a conflict over whether Laurent should come out to his parents.

Cast 
 Cyrille Thouvenin as Laurent Mouries
 Stéphan Guérin-Tillié as Cédric Martin
 Éva Darlan as Emma Martin
 Danièle Denie as Jeanne Mouries
 Idwig Stéphane as Pierre Mouries
 Caroline Veyt as Carole
 Laurence César as Martine
 Jean-Pierre Valère as Georges
 Raphaëlle Lubansu as Noëlle
 Jean-Baptiste Lefèvre as Didier
 Aurélie Godichal as Marine
 Jonathan Fox as Alain
 Marcel Dossogne as M. Bermand
 Bruno Georis as Médecin Emma
 Diego Vanhoutte as Mathieu

Ratings
The film was watched by 6.3 million viewers (28.6% market share) when it first aired.

See also 
 List of French-language films

References

External links 
 

2000 films
Belgian LGBT-related films
French LGBT-related films
2000s French-language films
Gay-related films
French-language Belgian films
2000s French films